Juárez is a municipality located in the eastern part of the Mexican state of Michoacán. The municipality has an area of 141.21 square kilometres (0.24% of the surface of the state) and is bordered to the north by the municipality of Zitácuaro, to the east  and south Susupuato, and to the west by Tuzantla and Jungapeo. The municipality had a population of 12, 016 inhabitants according to the 2005 census.  Its 
municipal seat is the city of Benito Juárez.

It is unknown what ethnic group dominated the present day municipality of Juárez region in pre-Columbian times.

The municipality is named after Benito Juárez, a Zapotec Amerindian who served five terms (1858–1861), (1861–1865), (1865–1867), (1867–1871), and (1871–1872), as President of Mexico.

Localities 

 Enandio

References

Municipalities of Michoacán